There are three species of skink named graceful short-legged skink endemic to the Philippines:
 Brachymeles gracilis
 Brachymeles hilong
 Brachymeles suluensis